The Prairie Learning Centre (PLC) is an educational centre located near Grasslands National Park, Saskatchewan, that hosts curriculum linked workshops on the native prairie landscape. With the support of Grasslands National Park, Chinook School Division and the Village of Val Marie, Saskatchewan, the Prairie Learning Centre is for secondary school students. The PLC aims to promote stewardship of the mixed grass prairie ecosystem.

Workshops linked to the grade 9-12 curriculum are available throughout the year. Program topics range from prairie ecology to First Nations storytelling. All programs take place on the native prairie of Grasslands National Park.

Grasslands National Park is one of the last remaining sections of mixed-grass prairie in Canada. It is home to the greater short-horned lizard (Saskatchewan's only lizard species), the black-footed ferret (the most endangered mammal in North America) and pronghorn (the second fastest land mammal in the world). The Committee on the Status of Endangered Wildlife in Canada have listed over 15 species found in the park as at risk.

Organizations based in Saskatchewan
Alternative education
Nature centres in Canada
Education in Saskatchewan